Kashmir is shared between Pakistan and India. Kashmiri wedding can therefore mean
 Marriage in Pakistan
 Weddings in India